Tamil Nadu State Highway 25 (SH-25) is a State Highway maintained by the Highways Department of Government of Tamil Nadu. It connects Trichy with Namakkal Town in the northwestern part of Tamil Nadu.One of the busiest State Highway in Tamil Nadu, which connects Bangalore, Mumbai and Hyderabad from Trichy.

Route 
The route is from Tiruchirappalli - Namakkal, via Srirangam, Gunaseelam, Musiri, Thottiyam, Meikalnackanpatty, Vazhavanthi, Valaiyappatti and Pudhupatti.

See also 
 Highways of Tamil Nadu

References

External links
 Thiruchchirappalli-Namakkal State Highway Map

State highways in Tamil Nadu
Road transport in Tiruchirappalli